Nationality words link to articles with information on the nation's poetry or literature (for instance, Irish or France).

Events
 June 4 — Joseph Brodsky is expelled from the Soviet Union.
 May 22 — Cecil Day-Lewis, Poet Laureate of the United Kingdom, dies at Lemmons, the home of writers Kingsley Amis and Elizabeth Jane Howard on the northern edge of London.
 Autumn — The first threnody attributed to E. J. Thribb (actually written by Barry Fantoni and colleagues) is published in the English satirical magazine Private Eye.
 October 10 — Sir John Betjeman is appointed Poet Laureate of the United Kingdom.
 November — The American Poetry Review founded by Stephen Berg in Philadelphia, Pennsylvania.
 W. H. Auden, now a U.S. citizen, declares his New York neighborhood is too dangerous and returns to Oxford from the United States for the winter.
 The Belfast Group, a discussion group of poets in Northern Ireland, goes out of existence this year. The group was started by Philip Hobsbaum when he moved to Belfast in 1963 and which included Seamus Heaney, Michael Longley, James Simmons, Paul Muldoon, Ciaran Carson, Stewart Parker, Bernard MacLaverty and the critics Edna Longley and Michael Allen. Heaney moves from Belfast to work in Dublin and live in County Wicklow.
 James K. Baxter, one of New Zealand's best-known poets, writes two original poems on the wallpaper of a room in the home of painter Michael Illingworth and his wife Dene. Soon after, Baxter dies. In 1973, after Baxter's death, the Illingworths remove the sections of wallpaper containing the poems and send them to the Hocken Library to be stored with Baxter's other papers.

Works published in English
Listed by nation where the work was first published and again by the poet's native land, if different; substantially revised works listed separately:

Australia
 Anne Elder, For the Record
 A.D. Hope, Collected Poems
 Les Murray, Poems Against Economics

Canada
 Earle Birney, Judith Copithorne, Andrew Suknaski, bill bissett, Four Parts Sand a selection of works by these concrete poets
 Leonard Cohen, The Energy of Slaves
 David Helwig, The Best Name of Silence
 George Johnston, Happy Enough: Poems 1935–1972.
Dennis Lee, Civil Elegies and Other Poems. Toronto: Anansi.
 Kenneth Leslie, O'Malley to the Reds And Other Poems. Halifax: By the Author.
 Dorothy Livesay, Collected Poems: The Two Seasons. Toronto: Mcgraw-Hill Ryerson.
 Gwendolyn MacEwen:
 * The Shadow-Maker. Toronto: Macmillan.
 The Armies of the Moon. Toronto: Macmillan, 1972. 
Don McKay, Moccasins on Concrete: Poems (Canada)
James Reaney, Poems.
Charles Sangster, The St Lawrence and the Saguenay and other poems; Hesperus and other poems and lyrics, intro. Gordon Johnston (Toronto: University of Toronto Press and Buffalo, N.Y.)
Raymond Souster, Selected Poems of Raymond Souster. Michael Maklem ed. Ottawa: Oberon Press.
Wilfred Watson, The Sorrowful Canadians

India in English
 Meena Alexander, Without Place, Calcutta: Writers Workshop, India .
 Ruskin Bond, It isn't Time That's Passing: Poems, 1970–71, Calcutta: Writers Workshop, India .
 Margaret Chatterjee, The Sandalwood Tree, Calcutta: Writers Workshop, India
 Dilip Chitre, Ambulance Ride,
 Gauri Deshpande, Beyond the Slaughter House, Calcutta: Writers Workshop, India
 Shree Devi, Shades of Green, Calcutta: Writers Workshop, India
 Mary Vasanti Erulkar, Mandala 2/5, Calcutta: Writers Workshop, India
 Samir Das Gupta, Paling Shadows, Calcutta: Writers Workshop, India
 Nandita Haksar, Ego and Other Poems, Delhi: Orient Longman
 Gopal R. Honnalgere, A Gesture of Fleshless Sound, Calcutta: Writers Workshop, India .
 Dilip Kumar Roy, Hark! His Flute!, Poona: Hari Krishna Mandir
 Syed Ameerudin:
 Poems of Protest, Sumter, South Carolina, United States: Poetry Eastwest; Indian poet, writing in English published in the United States
 What the Himalayas said and Other Poems, Madras: Kalaivendhan Publishers
 Pritish Nandy, editor, Indian Poetry in English, anthology
 Saleem Peerandina (ed.), Contemporary Indian Poetry in English: An Assessment and Selection, Madras: Macmillan India Ltd.

Ireland
 Eiléan Ní Chuilleanáin, Acts and Monuments, Dublin: The Gallery Press
 Seamus Heaney, Wintering Out, Faber & Faber, Northern Ireland poet published in the United Kingdom
 Pearse Hutchinson, Watching the Morning Grow, including "Sometimes Feel", Gallery Press
 Thomas Kinsella, Notes from the Land of the Dead Irish poet published in the United Kingdom
 Derek Mahon, Lives. Oxford University Press, Northern Ireland poet published in the United Kingdom
 John Montague, The Rough Field
 W. R. Rodgers, Collected Poems, Northern Ireland poet, published in the United Kingdom; posthumous

New Zealand
 James K. Baxter:
 Autumn Testament, not posthumous
 Stonegut Sugar Works, Junkies and the Fuzz, Ode to Auckland, and Other Poems, posthumous
 Alistair Campbell, Kapiti : Selected Poems 1947-71. Christchurch: Pegasus Press
 Allen Curnow, Trees, Effigies, Moving Objects
 Bill Manhire, The Elaboration
 Kendrick Smithyman, Earthquake Weather

United Kingdom
 J. R. Ackerley (died 1967), Micheldever and Other Poems
 James Aitchison, Sounds Before Sleep
 Anne Beresford, Footsteps
 Martin Booth, The Crying Embers
 Alan Brownjohn, Warrior's Career
 Florence Bull, Saint David's Day
 Kevin Crossley-Holland, The Rain-Giver
 Douglas Dunn, The Happier Life
 D. J. Enright, Daughters of Earth
 Elaine Feinstien, At the Edge, Sceptre Press
 James Fenton, Terminal Moraine
 Seamus Heaney, Wintering Out, Faber & Faber, Northern Ireland native published in the United Kingdom
 Michael Horovitz, The Wolverhampton Wanderer
 Ted Hughes, Selected Poems 1957–1967 (see also Selected Poems 1982, New Selected Poems 1995)
 Thomas Kinsella, Notes from the Land of the Dead Irish poet published in the United Kingdom
 Liz Lochhead, Memo for Spring
 George MacBeth, Collected Poems 1958-70
 Derek Mahon, Lives. Oxford University Press, Northern Ireland native published in the United Kingdom
 Adrian Mitchell, Ride the Nightmare
 Edwin Morgan, Glasgow Sonnets
 Norman Nicholson, A Local Habitation
 Brian Patten, And Sometimes It Happens
 Mervyn Peake, A Book of Nonsense
 Peter Porter, Preaching to the Converted
 Sally Purcell, The Holly Queen
 Peter Redgrove, Dr Faust's Sea-Spiral Spirit, and Other Poems
 R. S. Thomas, H'm, Welsh
 Norman Nicholson, A Local Habitation
 Kathleen Raine, the Lost Country
 W. R. Rodgers, Collected Poems, Northern Ireland poet, published in the United Kingdom; posthumous
 Vernon Scannell, Selected Poems
 Peter Scupham, The Snowing Globe
 Stevie Smith, Scorpion, and Other Poems, posthumous
 Charles Tomlinson, Written on Water

Anthologies in the United Kingdom
 Helen Gardner, The New Oxford Book of English Verse, replaced the 1939 revised selection by Quiller-Couch. 1972
 John Heath-Stubbs, co-editor, Penguin Modern Poets 20

United States
 A.R. Ammons:
 Briefings: Poems Small and Easy
 Collected Poems: 1951–1971, winner of the National Book Award in 1973
 John Ashbery, Three Poems
 W. H. Auden, Epistle to a Godson
 Ted Berrigan, Ron Padgett, and Tom Clark, Back In Boston Again
 John Berryman, Delusions, Etc. (New York: Farrar, Straus & Giroux) posthumous
 Elizabeth Bishop and Emanuel Brasil, editors, An Anthology of Twentieth Century Brazilian Poetry (Wesleyan University Press)
 Harold Bloom, Yeats (criticism)
 Joseph Brodsky: Poems, Ann Arbor, Michigan: Ardis, Russian–American
 Gwendolyn Brooks, Aurora
 Robert Creeley, A Day Book
 Stephen Dobyns, Concurring Beasts
 Hilda Doolittle (H.D.), Hermetic Definition
 Ed Dorn:
 The Hamadryas Baboon at the Lincoln Park Zoo, Wine Press
 Gunslinger, Book III: The Winterbook, Prologue to the Great Book IV Kornerstone, Frontier Press
 Michael S. Harper, Song: "I want a Witness"
 LeRoi Jones as Amiri Baraka, Spirit Reach
 Philip Levine, They Feed They Lion
 Archibald MacLeish, The Human Season: Selected Poems, 1926–1972, selected poems
 James Merrill, Braving the Elements
 Ned O'Gorman, The Flag the Hawk Flies
 Mary Oliver, The River Styx, Ohio, and Other Poems
 George Oppen, Collected Poems (only in Great Britain) and Seascape: Needle's Eye
 Michael Palmer, Blake's Newton (Black Sparrow Press)
 Kenneth Rexroth:
 100 Poems from the French (translator)
 Orchard Boat (translator)
 Theodore Roethke, Straw for Fire, posthumous selections made by David Wagoner from the poet's notebooks
 Louis Simpson, Adventures of the Letter I, including "American Dreams" and "Doubting"
 Patti Smith, Seventh Heaven
 James Tate, Absences
 Eleanor Ross Taylor, Welcome Eumenides
 Rosmarie Waldrop, The Aggressive Ways of the Casual Stranger (Random House)
 J. Rodolfo Wilcock (Argentine), La sinagoga degli iconoclasti, translated as The Temple of Iconoclasts

Other in English
 Wayne Brown, On the Coast, Caribbean
 Zulfikar Ghose, The Violent West, Pakistani poet lecturing in Texas
 Anthony McNeill, Reel from "The Life Movie", Jamaica
 James Matthews and Gladys Thomas, Cry Rage!, South Africa
 Wole Soyinka,  A Shuttle in the Crypt, Nigeria

Works published in other languages
Listed by nation where the work was first published and again by the poet's native land, if different; substantially revised works listed separately:

French language

Canada, in French
 Paul Chamberland, Éclats de la pierre noire d'oû rejaillit ma vie
 Gilles Hénault, complete works
 Gustave Lamarche, complete works
 Rina Lasnier, complete works
 Fernand Ouellette, complete works
 Suzanne Paradis, Il y eut un matin
 Jean-Guy Pilon, Silences pour une souveraine, Ottawa: Éditions de l'Université d'Ottawa
 Félix A. Savard, Le Bouscueil
 Gemma Tremblay, Souffles du midi
 Pierre Trottier, Sainte-Mémoire

France
 Marc Alyn, Infini au delà
 Philippe Chabaneix, Musiques d'avant la nuit
 Andrée Chedid, Visage premier
 Maurice Courant, Soleil de ma mémoire
 Micheline Dupray, L'Herbe est trop douce
 Gérard Genette, Figures III, one of three volumes of a work of critical scholarship in poetics – general theory of literary form and analysis of individual works — the Figures volumes are concerned with the problems of poetic discourse and narrative in Stendhal, Flaubert and Proust and in Baroque poetry (see also Figures I 1966, Figures II 1969)
 Eugène Guillevic, Encoches
 Edmond Jabès, Aély
 Pierre Loubière, Mémoire buisonnière
 Pierre Moussaric, Chansons du temps présent
 Marie Noël, Chants des quatre temps (posthumous)
 Hélène Parmelin, De Songe et de silence
 Saint-John Perse, Œuvres Complètes, Paris: Gallimard
 Denis Roche, Le Mécrit
 Claude Royet-Journoud, Le Renversement
 Claire de Soujeole, Pas dans la rosée

Germany
 Heinrich Böll, Gedichte, nine poems
 Andreas Okopenko, Orte wechselnden Unbehagens
 Reiner Kunze, Zimmerlautstärke
 Peter Huchel, Neue Gedichte
 Günter Kunert, Offenere Ausgang
 Beat Brechbühl, Der gechlagene Hund pisst an die Saüle des Tempels
 Heiner Bastian, Tod im Leben, a long poem

Hebrew
 Abraham Shlonsky, Ketavim
 David Fogel, Kol ha-Shirim, collected by Dan Pagis, edited by Y. Cohen
 E. Zussman, Atzai Tamid
 T. Ribner, Ain Lehashiv
 Yair Hurvitz, Narkisim le-Malhut Madmena
 Abba Kovner, Lahakat ha-Katzav

India
Listed in alphabetical order by first name:
 Chandranath Mishra, Unata pal, humorous and satirical poems by "a major poet of Maithili", according to Indian academic Sisir Kumar Das (a revised and expanded edition of Yugacakra 1952)
 Harumal Isardas Sadarangani, Piraha Ji Bakha, Sindhi-language
 Hiren Bhattacharya, Mor Des Mor Premar Kavita ("Poems of My Country and of My Love"),  Assamese language
 Namdeo Dhasal, Golpitha; Marathi-language
 Niranjan Bhagat, Kavina Ketlak Prashno (Indian, writing in Gujarati), criticism
 Vasant Abaji Dahake, Yogabhrashta (translated into English by Ranjit Hoskote and Mangesh Kulkarni as A Terrorist of the Spirit;New Delhi: Harper Collins/Indus, 1992); Marathi-language
 Yumlembam Ibomcha Singh, Shingnaba Vol. I & II, Imphal; Meitei language

Italy
 Riccardo Bacchelli, La stella del mattino
 Marino Moretti, Tre anni e un giorno
 Aldo Palazzeschi, Via dalle cento stelle
 Tommaso Landolfi, Viola di morte, winner of the Fiuggi Prize
 Edoardo Sanguineti, Wirrwarr
 Giorgio Manganelli, Agli Dei ulteriori
 Ferdinando Camon, La vita eterna

Norway
 Hans Børli, Kyndelsmesse
 Per Arneberg, Oktobernetter
 Ernst Orvil, Nok sagt

Russia
 Konstantin Simonov, Vietnam. Summer 1970
 Aleksandr Bezymenski, The Law of the Heart, collected poems
 David Kugultinov, Kalmyk poet, Revolt of the Intellect

Spanish language

Spain
 Matilde Camus, Manantial de amor (Love Spring)
 Pedro Salinas, Poesía, selected by Julio Cortázar
 Ángel González, Palabra sobre palabra
 Saul Yukievich, Fundadores de la nueva poesía latinoamericana, a collection of studies published in Spain by an Argentinian
 Darie Novaceanu and J.M. Caballero Bonald, translators and editors, Poesía rumana contemporánea, a bilingual edition of Romanian poems translated into Spanish.

Latin America
 Hugo Achugar, Con bigote triste
 Rosario Castellanos, Poesía no eres tú: Obra poética, 1948–1971
 Rafael Méndez Dorich, editor, Profundo Centro, an anthology (Lima), Peru
 Aída Vitale, Oidor andante
 Idea Vilariño, Poemas de amor

Yiddish language
 Asya, Quiver of Boughs
 Beyle Schaechter-Gottesman, Footpaths Between Walls
 Zyameh Telesin, Cries of Memory
 Rachel Baumwoll, Longed For
 Israel's President Shazer:
 During a Mission
 For Myself
 Rivkah Bassman, Bright Stones
 Malkah Chefetz-Tuzman, Leaves Do Not Fall
 Rachel H. Korn, On the Edge of a Moment
 Joshuah Rivin, Rainbow of Song
 Saul Maltz, With Joy and Song (for younger readers)

Other
 Jørgen Gustava Brandt, Upraktiske digte. Udvalg, selected poems from 1953 to 1971, Denmark
 Odysseus Elytis, The Light Tree And The Fourteenth Beauty (Το φωτόδεντρο και η δέκατη τέταρτη ομορφιά) and The Monogram (Το Μονόγραμμα) Greece
 Nizar Qabbani, Poems Against The Law, Syrian poet writing in Arabic
 Karl Ristikivi, Inimese teekond ("The journey of a man"), Estonian poet published in Sweden
 Wisława Szymborska: Wszelki wypadek ("Could Have"), Poland
 Johannes Wulff, Udvalgte digte. Vi som er hinanden, collected poems from 1928 to 1970, Denmark

Awards and honors
 Nobel Prize in Literature: Heinrich Böll, West Germany

Canada
 See 1979 Governor General's Awards for a complete list of winners and finalists for those awards.

United Kingdom
 Cholmondeley Award: Molly Holden, Tom Raworth, Patricia Whittaker
 Eric Gregory Award: Tony Curtis, Richard Berengarten, Brian Oxley, Andrew Greig, Robin Lee, Paul Muldoon
 Keats Prize: Noël Welch

United States
 Pulitzer Prize for Poetry: James Wright, Collected Poems
 National Book Award for Poetry: Frank O'Hara, The Collected Works of Frank O'Hara
 Fellowship of the Academy of American Poets: W. D. Snodgrass

Births
 March 1 – Rie Yasumi やすみ りえ pen name of Reiko Yasumi 休 理英子, Japanese Senryū poet (a woman)
 April 16 – Tracy K. Smith, African American poet, United States Poet Laureate
 April 24 – Sinéad Morrissey, Northern Irish poet
 June 28 – Geeta Tripathee, Nepali poet, lyricist and literary critic
 August 18 – Adda Djørup, Danish poet and fiction writer (a woman)
 Shimon Adaf, Israeli poet and author
 Alissa Quart, American nonfiction writer, critic, journalist, editor and poet

Deaths

Birth years link to the corresponding "[year] in poetry" article:
 January 1 – Eberhard Wolfgang Möller, 65 (born 1906), German playwright and poet
 January 7 – John Berryman, 57 (born 1914), American poet, from suicide by jumping off a bridge into the Mississippi River
 January 8 – Kenneth Patchen, 60 (born 1911), American poet and painter, of a heart attack
 January 11 – Padraic Colum, 90, Irish–American poet
 February 5 – Marianne Moore, 84 (born 1887), American Modernist poet and writer
 March 4 – Richard Church (poet), 78, English poet, critic and novelist
 May 22 – Cecil Day-Lewis, 68 English poet
 c June – Winifred Mary Letts (born 1882), English writer
 August 2 – Paul Goodman (born 1911), American poet, of a heart attack
 August 21 – A.M. Klein, 61, Ukrainian-Canadian poet and writer
 August 24 – Venkatarama Ramalingam Pillai, 83 (born 1888), Indian Tamil-language poet and freedom fighter
 September 25 – Alejandra Pizarnik, 36 (born 1936), Argentinian poet, suicide by overdose
 October 3 – Gladys Schmitt, 63 (born 1909), American poet
 October 22 – James K. Baxter, 46, New Zealand poet
 November 1 – Ezra Pound, 87 (born 1885), American poet, critic and the driving force behind several Modernist movements, notably Imagism and Vorticism, from an intestinal blockage
 November 20 – Robert Fletcher (poet), 87, American "cowboy poet" of "Don't Fence Me In"
 December 10
 Eileen Duggan, 78, New Zealand poet and journalist
 Mark Van Doren, 78, American poet, academic and critic
 December 20 – Günter Eich (born 1907) German poet, dramatist and author

See also

 Poetry
 List of poetry awards
 List of years in poetry

References

20th-century poetry
Poetry